The Checkered Coat is a 1948 American drama film directed by Edward L. Cahn and written by John C. Higgins. The film stars Tom Conway, Noreen Nash, Hurd Hatfield, James Seay, Garry Owen and Marten Lamont. The film was released on July 16, 1948 by 20th Century-Fox.

Plot

Cast   
Tom Conway as Dr. Michael Madden
Noreen Nash as Betty Madden
Hurd Hatfield as Steve 'Creepy' Bolin
James Seay as Capt. Dunhill
Garry Owen as Prince
Marten Lamont as Fred Madden
Frank Cady as Skinner
Leonard Mudie as Jerry
Russell Arms as Dr. Stevenson
Lee Bonnell as Dr. Pryor
Julian Rivero as Cafe Owner
Dorothy Porter as Singer
Sam Hayes as Announcer
Dewey Robinson as Bartender
Rory Mallinson as Perkins
John Hamilton as Marcus Anson 
Fred Browne as Bill Anson
Eddie Dunn as Brownlee
Lee Tung Foo as Kim

References

External links 
 

1948 films
1940s English-language films
20th Century Fox films
American drama films
1948 drama films
Films directed by Edward L. Cahn
American black-and-white films
1940s American films